Kalidas Rangalaya is one of Bihar's well-known theatres and a center for cultural performances in Patna, India. It is in the southeast corner of Gandhi Maidan and is run by the Bihar Art Theater which is the regional centre of International Theatre Institute, UNESCO, Paris.

History
Named after Kālidāsa, it was established on 9 October 1974 by Anil Kumar Mukherjee. It is built on land given by the Government of Bihar to Bihar Art Theater to promote and pursue theatrical and cultural activities in the state capital.

Overview
Today the Kalidas Rangalaya consists of a stage, auditorium, Bihar Institute of Dramatics office and a cafeteria, known as 'Annapurna'. The complex also houses Shakuntala Janta Theater, Priyambada Children's Theater, Anasuya Art Gallery and Abhyathna Guest House for artists. Classes in dance and music forms, painting, and photography are offered at the complex.

See also
 Bhartiya Nritya Kala Mandir
 Premchand Rangshala
 Manoj Bhawuk has done his diploma in Drama

References

Theatres in Patna
1974 establishments in Bihar
Arts organisations based in India
Music schools in India
Art schools in India
Education in Patna
Culture of Bihar
Dance schools in India
Art museums and galleries in India